Green Wing is a surreal medical sitcom starring Tamsin Greig, Stephen Mangan and Julian Rhind-Tutt. All the episodes were written by a team of eight writers working on every episode together. The writers are Victoria Pile (who is also the producer), Robert Harley, Gary Howe, Stuart Kenworthy, Oriane Messina, Richard Preddy, Fay Rusling and James Henry. The series was directed by Tristram Shapeero and Dominic Brigstocke. The first series consisted of nine episodes broadcast between 3 September and 29 October 2004 on Channel 4. A DVD of the series was released on 3 April 2006. The scripts of the first series entitled Green Wing: The Complete First Series Scripts were released in paperback on 22 October 2006. The first series was received well by both critics and fans. The series also won several awards including a BAFTA, two Royal Television Society (RTS) awards, and a Rose d'Or.

In the first series, the main plot involves a love triangle between surgical registrar Dr. Caroline Todd (Greig), anaesthetist Dr. Guy Secretan (Mangan), and surgeon Dr. "Mac" Macartney (Rhind-Tutt) and the affair between consultant radiologist Dr. Alan Statham (Mark Heap) who is in love with Joanna Clore (Pippa Haywood), the director of human resources.

Cast
The thirteen main characters appear in all nine episodes of the first series. Amongst the recurring guest characters, Lyndon, Oliver (Ken Charles), Lady Emily "Emmy" Lewis Westbrook (Daisy Haggard), Liam (Oliver Milburn), Cordelia Denby (Saskia Wickham), and Charles Robertson (Harley) all appear. However, Charles is credited as "Chief Executive" in the episode that he appears. Guest actors who appear in this series include John Oliver, Stephen Merchant, Kevin Eldon and Rosie Cavaliero. Other than Harley, other Green Wing writers make cameos. These include Fay Rusling, Gary Howe, Oriane Messina and Henry James.

Reception
The first series is the most popular amongst Green Wing fans. According to one poll conducted in 2006 (before the final special episode was broadcast), the fifth episode of the series, "Housewarming Party", was voted the best Green Wing episode of all. The second most popular was the eighth episode of series one, "Slave Auction". "Housewarming Party" was also watched at the "Wingin' It Green Wing convention", being voted the favourite episode in, "A landslide victory".

The series was also commented positively by critics. A. A. Gill from The Times praised the cast and characters, although he did comment negatively on the filming style and dramatic qualities. He also said

"...it was one of the most freshly funny and crisply innovative comedies for years. The humour was all based in the character, not the situation. The story lines were negligible; there were no catch phrases; it was surreal in a way we hadn't seen since Monty Python; and the cast were actors being funny from inside a characterisation, not stand-up comics bolting a cartoon persona onto the back of gags."

Awards
The series received a number of awards. It was the first series ever to win the BAFTA Pioneer Audience Award in 2004, the only BAFTA voted for by the public. Haywood won the 2005 Rose d'Or for "Best Female Comedy Performance". Greig won the 2005 RTS award for "Best Comedy Performance". Jonathan Whitehead, who wrote music for the show, won the 2005 RTS Craft & Design Award for "Best Original Score".

Episodes

References
Pile, Victoria; Harley, Robert; Henry, James; Howe, Gary; Kenworthy, Stuart; Messina, Oriane; Preddy, Richard; Rusling, Fay. Green Wing: The Complete First Series Scripts. London: Titan Books, 2006. .

Notes

Green Wing